Xiankang (咸康) was a Chinese era name used by several emperors of China. It may refer to:

Xiankang (335–342), era name used by Emperor Cheng of Jin
Xiankang (925–926), era name used by Wang Zongyan, emperor of Former Shu